Volume 10 or Volume X or Volume Ten may refer to:
Volume 10 (rapper)
Volume 10: I Heart Disco, Desert Sessions
Ed Rec Vol. X
Volume 10, album by The Vibrators

See also